Emili Rosales i Castellà (born February 12, 1968) is a Catalan writer and editor. He began in the field of poetry, but quickly became a novelist. After publishing three books in four years, he dedicated five years to publish the fifth. Rosales' fifth novel was called La ciutat invisible. The novel's plot alternates between the present day and the reign of Charles III of Spain. 
The effort was rewarded and La ciutat invisible won the Sant Jordi award and received great reviews. The novel has been translated into Spanish and English (as The Invisible City). 

Rosales has also worked as a translator and as a literature professor. He occasionally publishes book reviews in the press. He is the editorial director of Grup 62 (a publishing house) and Destino.

Work

Poetry
 1989 – Ciutats i mar
 1991 – Els dies i tu

Novels
 1995 – La casa de la platja
 1997 – Els amos del món
 1999 – Mentre Barcelona dorm
 2005 – La ciutat invisible

Awards
 2005 – Sant Jordi for La ciutat invisible

References

 

Living people
Writers from Catalonia
Spanish historical novelists
Writers of historical fiction set in the early modern period
1968 births